Alex Honório Júnior (born 12 July 2001), commonly known as Alex, is a Brazilian footballer who currently plays as a forward for Taquaritinga, on loan from Figueirense.

Career statistics

Club

Notes

References

2001 births
Living people
Sportspeople from Londrina
Brazilian footballers
Association football forwards
Sport Club Corinthians Paulista players
Paraná Soccer Technical Center players
Figueirense FC players
Clube Atlético Taquaritinga players
21st-century Brazilian people